Calathus circumseptus is a species of ground beetle from the Platyninae subfamily that can be found in Albania, France, Greece, Italy, Portugal, Spain, and certain islands.

References

circumseptus
Beetles described in 1824
Beetles of Europe